Cees Koch may refer to:

 Cees Koch (canoeist) (born 1925), Dutch sprint canoer
 Cees Koch (discus thrower) (born 1936), Dutch retired discus thrower and shot putter